United States gubernatorial elections were held on November 5, 1974, in 35 states and two territories. The Democrats achieved a net gain of four seats, Republicans took a net loss of five seats, and one Independent was elected to the governorship of a state. This election coincided with the Senate and the House elections.

In Iowa, Kansas, South Dakota and Texas, governors were elected to four-year terms for the first time, instead of two-year terms. This is the first time a woman has been elected governor whose husband was not governor of any state. (In this case, Connecticut.)

Election results 1974
A bolded state name features an article about the specific election.

States

Territories and federal district

See also
1974 United States elections
1974 United States Senate elections
1974 United States House of Representatives elections

Notes

References

 
November 1974 events in the United States